Elaine Englehardt is an American philosopher and Distinguished Professor of Ethics and a Professor of Philosophy at Utah Valley University.

Books
 Englehardt, Elaine E.; Pritchard, Michael S. (eds.). Ethics across the curriculum—pedagogical perspectives. Cham: Springer-Verlag.
 Elaine E. Englehardt, Michael S. Pritchard, Kerry D. Romesburg, Brian Schrag. Ethical Challenges of Academic Administration, Springer 2009
Lisa H. Newton, Elaine E. Englehardt, Michael S. Pritchard. Clashing Views in Business Ethics and Society
Elaine E. Englehardt, Donald Schmeltekopf (eds.). "Ethics and Life: An Interdisciplinary Look at the Humanities",  McGraw-Hill 2010
CE Harris, Michael Pritchard, Ray James and Elaine Englehardt “Engineering Ethics: Concepts and Cases”, Cengage, 2019

References

21st-century American philosophers
Philosophy academics
Utah Valley University faculty
University of Utah alumni
Brigham Young University alumni
American women philosophers
Living people
Year of birth missing (living people)